John Jackson (born 5 September 1885) was a Scottish footballer who played for clubs including Clyde, Leeds City, Ayr United, Celtic and Dundee, mainly as an inside left although he could also perform at wing half.

In the early part of his career with Clyde, he appeared in the Scottish Cup finals of 1910 and 1912, finishing on the losing side on both occasions.

With the English Football League suspended during World War I, he returned to his native Ayrshire and played for several Scottish clubs on loan from Leeds City, while working in the Nobel Enterprises explosives factory, later serving in the Royal Scots Fusiliers. During one of these wartime spells, he was in the Celtic team which won the 1918 War Fund Shield, and appeared in six Scottish Football League matches as the club won the title, though it is doubtful that he would have been presented with a medal. The previous year he had been granted permission to turn out for Rangers on the same basis, but it appears he never played in a first team game for them, and soon joined Celtic instead.

Jackson played in the annual Home Scots v Anglo-Scots trial match in 1910 and was selected once for the Scottish Football League XI in 1912, but never received a full international cap.

References

1885 births
Year of death unknown
Footballers from Irvine, North Ayrshire
Scottish footballers
Irvine Victoria F.C. players
Irvine Meadow XI F.C. players
Ardeer Thistle F.C. players
Clyde F.C. players
Leeds City F.C. players
Celtic F.C. players
Ayr United F.C. players
Clydebank F.C. (1914) players
Motherwell F.C. players
Dundee F.C. players
Scottish Football League players
English Football League players
Scottish Football League representative players
Scottish Junior Football Association players
Association football inside forwards
British Army personnel of World War I
Royal Scots Fusiliers soldiers